Tom Long (born March 1, 1982, in Poughkeepsie, New York) is an American racing driver.

Racing record

Career summary

WeatherTech SportsCar Championship results
(key)(Races in bold indicate pole position. Races in italics indicate fastest race lap in class. Results are overall/class)

References

External links
  
 Tom Long

1982 births
Living people
Racing drivers from New York (state)
WeatherTech SportsCar Championship drivers

Newman Wachs Racing drivers
Wayne Taylor Racing drivers
Michelin Pilot Challenge drivers